Julie Marie Edge is a Manx politician from the Liberal Vannin Party. She represented Onchan in the House of Keys from 2016 and was re-elected in 2021 with an increased vote share.

She is currently serving as Minister of Education.

Election results

2016

2021

References 

Living people
Manx women in politics
Liberal Vannin Party politicians
Members of the House of Keys 2016–2021
Members of the House of Keys 2021–2026
21st-century British women politicians
Year of birth missing (living people)
Women government ministers in the United Kingdom

Education ministers of the United Kingdom